Sebastian Münster (20 January 1488 – 26 May 1552) was a German cartographer and cosmographer. He also was a Christian Hebraist scholar who taught as a professor at the University of Basel. His well-known work, the highly accurate world map, Cosmographia, sold well and went through 24 editions. Its influence was widely spread by a production of woodcuts created of it by a variety of artists.

Life

He was born in Ingelheim, near Mainz, the son of Andreas Münster. His parents and other ancestors were farmers.
In 1505, he entered the Franciscan order. Four years later, he entered a monastery where he became a student of Konrad Pelikan for five years. Münster completed his studies at the University of Tübingen in 1518. His graduate adviser was Johannes Stöffler.He left the Franciscans for the Lutheran Church in order to accept an appointment at the Reformed Church-dominated University of Basel in 1529. He had long harboured an interest in Lutheranism, and during the German Peasants' War, as a monk, he had been repeatedly attacked. A professor of Hebrew, and a disciple of Elias Levita, he edited the Hebrew Bible (2 vols. fol., Basel, 1534–1535), accompanied by a Latin translation and a large number of annotations. He was the first German to produce an edition of the Hebrew Bible.

He published more than one Hebrew grammar, and was the first to prepare a Grammatica Chaldaica (Basel, 1527). His lexicographical labours included a Dictionarium Chaldaicum (1527), and a Dictionarium trilingue for Latin, Greek, and Hebrew in 1530.

He released a Mappa Europae (map of Europe) in 1536. In 1537, he published a Rabbinical translation of the Gospel of Matthew in Hebrew which he had obtained from Spanish Conversos. In 1540 he published a Latin edition of Ptolemy's Geographia with illustrations. The 1550 edition contains cities, portraits, and costumes. These editions, printed in Germany, are the most valued of this work. Other writings that followed are Horologiographia (a treatise on dialling – constructing sundials, Basel, 1531), and Organum Uranicum (a treatise on the planetary motions, 1536).His Cosmographia of 1544 was the earliest description of the world in the German-language. It had numerous editions in different languages including Latin, French, Italian, English, and even Czech. The Cosmographia was one of the most successful and popular works of the 16th century. It passed through 24 editions in 100 years. This success was due to the fascinating woodcuts (some by Hans Holbein the Younger, Urs Graf, Hans Rudolph Manuel Deutsch, and David Kandel), in addition to including the first to introduce "separate maps for each of the four continents known then – America, Africa, Asia and Europe." It was most important in reviving geography in 16th-century Europe. The last German edition was published in 1628, long after his death.
Münster was also known as translator of the Hebrew Bible (Hebraica Biblia). His edition was published in two volumes (1546) in Basel. The first volume contains the books from Genesis to 2 Kings, following the order of the Masoretic codices. The second volume contains The Prophets (Major and Minor), The Psalms, Job, Proverb, Daniel, Chronicles, and the Five Scrolls (The Song of Songs, Ruth, Lamentations, Ecclesiastes and Esther).

His Rudimenta Mathematica was published in Basel in 1551.

He died at Basel of the plague in 1552. Münster's tombstone describes him as the Ezra and the Strabo of the German people.

Gallery
Several paintings with oil on canvas, woodcuts and copper etchings depict Sebastian Münster, by Hans Holbein d. J. (Basel, c. 1530), Willem de Haen (1615), as rector of the University of Basel (by Christoph Amberger, um 1547), and on the 100-DM-bill as used 1962 to 1991.

References

Further reading
Karl Heinz Burmeister: Sebastian Münster – Versuch eines biographischen Gesamtbildes. Basler Beiträge zur Geschichtswissenschaft, Band 91, Basel und Stuttgart 1963 und 1969.
Karl Heinz Burmeister: Sebastian Münster – Eine Bibliographie. Wiesbaden 1964.
Ralf Kern: Wissenschaftliche Instrumente in ihrer Zeit. Vol. 1. Cologne, 2010. pp. 307–311.
Hans Georg Wehrens: Freiburg in der „Cosmographia“ von Sebastian Münster (1549); in Freiburg im Breisgau 1504 m–1803, Holzschnitte und Kupferstiche. Verlag Herder, Freiburg 2004, S. 34 ff. .
Günther Wessel: Von einem, der daheim blieb, die Welt zu entdecken - Die Cosmographia des Sebastian Münster oder Wie man sich vor 500 Jahren die Welt vorstellte. Campus Verlag, Frankfurt 2004, .

 Werner Raupp: MÜNSTER, Sebastian. In: Biographisch-Bibliographisches Kirchenlexikon (BBKL). Band 6, Bautz, Herzberg 1993, Sp. 316–326 (with detailed bibliography).

External links

Lateinische Werke im Internet
Wer war Sebastian Münster? - Umfangreiche Dokumentensammlung des Sebastian-Münster-Gymnasiums in Ingelheim.
Sebastian Münster, La Cosmographie universelle online excerpts
Historic Cities: Sebastian Münster
Schreckenfuchs 1553 Oratio Funebris de Obitu Ssebastiani Munsteri
Online Galleries, History of Science Collections, University of Oklahoma Libraries High resolution images of works by and/or portraits of Sebastian Munster in .jpg and .tiff format.
 "The Strange Career of the Biblia Rabbinica among Christian Hebraists, 1517–1620"
 The Munster Map - Simcoe County Archives
Maps by Munster, Eran Laor Cartographic Collection, the National Library of Israel
Digitized high-resolution images of the 1540 first edition of the Geographia Universalis - from RareMaps.com

1488 births
1552 deaths
German cartographers
Christian Hebraists
16th-century cartographers
16th-century German translators